Rigoberto Paredes (26 April 1948 – 9 March 2015) was a Honduran poet, essayist and publisher. He was the founder of Editorial Guaymuras, Editores Unidos and Ediciones Librería Paraíso. Among his works were En el Lugar de los hechos (1974); Las cosas por su nombre (1978); Materia prima (1985); Fuego lento (1989); La estación perdida  (2001).

He received the Ramón Rosa National Literature Award in 2006.

References

1948 births
2015 deaths
21st-century Honduran poets
21st-century male writers
Honduran male poets
20th-century Honduran poets
20th-century male writers